Trout Lake, formerly known as Fish Lake and Soda Butte Lake, is a  popular backcountry lake for hikers and anglers in Yellowstone National Park. The lake sits in a depression on a high bench above the Soda Butte Creek Canyon. A steep trail through a Douglas fir forest leads to the lake. The trailhead is located at: .

Trout Lake is a popular area for viewing North American river otter.

Angling
Trout Lake is popular with anglers for its large (14-20") Yellowstone cutthroat trout and very large (20-30") rainbow trout and rainbow/cutthroat hybrids. The lake can be easily fished from the shoreline, but many anglers carry in float tubes to access the deeper parts of the lake. Using a float tube on Yellowstone lakes requires a park service boating permit. The lake opens for fishing on Memorial Day weekend.  The inlet stream to the lake is permanently closed to protect spawning cutthroat trout. All cutthroat trout and hybrids caught in Trout Lake must be released.

See also
 Angling in Yellowstone National Park
 Fishes of Yellowstone National Park

Notes

Lakes of Yellowstone National Park
Lakes of Wyoming
Bodies of water of Park County, Wyoming